Gennady Prokopenko (born 18 January 1964) is a Soviet ski jumper. He competed in the normal hill and large hill events at the 1984 Winter Olympics.

References

1964 births
Living people
Soviet male ski jumpers
Olympic ski jumpers of the Soviet Union
Ski jumpers at the 1984 Winter Olympics
Sportspeople from Perm, Russia